Teskan may refer to:
Teskan, Afghanistan
Teşkan, Azerbaijan